Alice Cooper (April 8, 1875 – March 4, 1937) was an American sculptor.

Early life and education
Cooper was born in Glenwood, Iowa and was raised in Denver, Colorado.

She studied under Preston Powers (son of the sculptor Hiram Powers) then at the Art Institute of Chicago with Lorado Taft and the Art Students League of New York through about 1901.

Career
Cooper is best known for her bronze figure of Sacajawea (Sacajawea and Jean-Baptiste) originally produced as the centerpiece for the Lewis and Clark Centennial Exposition in Portland, Oregon, 1905, unveiled in a ceremony attended by Susan B. Anthony and other prominent feminists.  This figure now stands in Washington Park.

Other work includes:
 Bronze figure of Almeron Eager of Evansville, Wisconsin, 1907
 Work produced for the United States Customs House in San Francisco, California, for architects Eames and Young, circa 1911

She displayed work at her alma mater, Art Institute of Chicago, as well as the Pennsylvania Academy of Fine Arts and the National Academy of Design. Some of her works were sold by Tiffany & Co.

Personal life
Cooper resided in Denver, Colorado, as well as Illinois and Iowa. In 1905 she married Nathan M. Hubbard and moved to Des Moines, Iowa. They had three daughters.

She died on March 4, 1937, in Chicago, Illinois, at age 62.

References

American women sculptors
Art Students League of New York alumni
1875 births
1937 deaths
People from Glenwood, Iowa
Artists from Denver
Sculptors from Iowa
School of the Art Institute of Chicago alumni
20th-century American sculptors
20th-century American women artists
Sculptors from New York (state)
Sculptors from Colorado